Arsenic sulfide may refer to:                                                                                                                                                                                                                                                                                                                      
Arsenic trisulfide, As2S3, the mineral orpiment
 Arsenic pentasulfide, As2S5, similar structure to phosphorus pentasulfide (β-P2S5)
Tetraarsenic tetrasulfide, As4S4, the mineral realgar
Tetraarsenic trisulfide, As4S3, the mineral α- or β- dimorphite